, pen name , is a Japanese manga artist best known for his works The Vision of Escaflowne, Futari Ecchi, and Psychic Academy. Mine Yoshizaki is one of Aki's former assistants.

List of works

Manga creations
The following is a list of Katsu Aki's works, both major and minor, since his debut:

After his mother died, high school student Hiroshi Houjou's long lost father suddenly reappears, with two new family members: a new mother who's also a famous actress, and her daughter, the popular and beautiful idol singer Rina Yuuki. Adapted to OAV

Hitomi Hoshino, a 16-year-old high school student with an interest in mysticism, experiences strange dreams at night. A mysterious temple. a tremendous jewel, a shadowy prince... the images trouble her, and a strange incantation keeps echoing in her mind. One day - during a simple fortune telling at school - Hitomi feels a magical pull, and in a shocking moment she is pulled from her body. She wakes up in a strange world where the Earth hangs in the sky and a headstrong prince asks her to power his god, the deity Escaflowne. Loosely based on the TV series.

Makoto and Yura are two 25-year-old virgins who get married. We follow the comedic adventures and mishaps of their attempts at learning how to have sex as influenced by each other, other peoples' experiences, and the media. Adapted to OAV
AYA
After his fiancée, Aya, dies in a car accident, Keisuke meets her 3 sisters, who not only look exactly like Aya but are all named Aya as well.

The Psychic Academy is a school for students who have "aura ability." These people can use certain elements (i.e. fire, water, earth) depending on their aura. Shiomi Ai is a new student, unsure of his ability, which has yet to reveal itself. He hopes to reunite with his childhood friend/crush Orina but once there, he meets Mew, a powerful aura user who doesn't like to talk. "Psychic Academy" follows Shiomi's relationships between Orina and Mew while he tries to figure out his place in the aura world. Adapted to ONA

Futa Kinashi is a single, average salaryman who has always had terrible luck with women. After being set up and cheated by two girls, he looks for help from a marriage arrangement agency. At a party held by the agency, he meets a strange girl wearing sunglasses and a mask asking him for a date. Accepting her explanation that she's painfully shy, Fuuta decides to go through with the date as planned. Slowly he finds himself falling for this mystery girl's sweet and shy demeanor, despite the fact that she insists on wearing a different disguise each time they meet. Ultimately deciding that her looks don't matter, the two of them get married. On their first night together, she finally removes her mask and reveals her true identity: Kirari, a beautiful and famous pop idol (and Futa is her biggest fan), who has a secret wish: to get married with a man who doesn't love her beauty, money, or fame—but her true self (which is why she hid her face). Unfortunately, there is a catch: the marriage must be kept secret from the world for one full year in order for Kirari's record company to accept it... and if anyone discovers their relationship before then, they will be forced to get a divorce. Fuuta decides that no price is too high to pay for true love, and so the newlyweds swear that they will do whatever it takes to stay together.

External links
 Official website 
 Wiki about Katsu Aki 

1961 births
Living people
Manga artists from Fukuoka Prefecture
People from Fukuoka
Osaka University of Arts alumni
Pseudonymous artists
20th-century pseudonymous writers
21st-century pseudonymous writers